Bangladesh is a riverine country. According to Bangladesh Water development board (BWDB) about 230 rivers currently flow in Bangladesh (during summer and winter), although the number stated are ambiguous in some sources. As stated by a publication called বাংলাদেশের নদ-নদী  by BWDB (Bangladesh Water development board), 310 rivers flow in the summer although they republished another study in 6 volumes where stated 405 rivers. The number differs widely due to lack of research on the counts and the fact that these rivers changes flow in time and season. Historical sources state about 700 to 800 rivers but most of them have dried out or are extinct due to lack of attention and pollution. The numbers also differ because the same rivers may change names in different regions and through history. About 17 rivers are on the verge of extinction and the 54 rivers flow directly from India and 3 from Myanmar. 

A total of 57 international rivers flow through Bangladesh. The international number of rivers can be 58 as Brahmaputra is called "Nod" while the general term for river is "Nodi". The gender division of rivers is interesting from history and mainly depending on the source of the river but not the size or flow briskness.Sangu and Halda are the only two internal rivers originated and finished within Bangladesh. Brahmaputra is the longest river and Padma is the swiftest. Jamuna is the widest river. But the number differs ambiguously due to the lack of updated information. Most of the country's land is formed through silt brought by the rivers. Bangladesh geography and culture is influenced by the riverine delta system. Bangladesh lies in the biggest river delta of the world - the Ganges Delta system.

Major rivers

Following is a list of some of the major rivers of Bangladesh:

 Atrai River
 Arialkha River
 Balu River
 Bangali River
 Bangshi River
 Baral River
 Bhairab River
 Biskhali River
 Brahmaputra River (see section below)
 Bura Gauranga River
 Buriganga River
 Chiknai River
 Chitra River
 Dakatia River
 Dhaleshwari River
 Dhanshiri River
 Dhanu River
 Dharla River
 Dhepa River
 Feni River
 Ganges River (see section below)
 Garai River
 Gomti River
 Gorai-Madhumati River
 Halda River
 Ichhamati River
 Jaldhaka River
 Jamuna River
 Jinai River
 Kaliganga River
 Kangsha River
 Karatoya River
 Karnaphuli River
 Kazipur River
 Khowai River
 Kirtankhola
 Kobadak River
 Kopothakho River
 Kumar River
 Kushiyara River
 Louhajang River
 Mahananda River
 Manu River, Tripura
 Madhumati River
 Mathabhanga River
 Meghna River
 Muhuri River
 Nabaganga River
 Naf River
 Nagar River (Rajshahi)
 Nagar River (Rangpur)
 Nalia River
 Padma River
 Punarbhaba River
 Pusur River
 Sangu River
 Shitalakshya River
 Surma River
 Teesta River
 Titas River
 Tulshiganga River
 Turag River
 Louhajang River

Ganges-Brahmaputra Delta
Much of Bangladesh's geography is dominated by the Ganges-Brahmaputra Delta, but the term "Ganges" is not widely used for the larger river's main distributary within Bangladesh. Where it flows out of India, the Ganges' main channel becomes the Padma River. Similarly, below its confluence with the Teesta River, the main channel of the Brahmaputra River is known as the Jamuna River.

Bogra District

There are quite a few rivers in the district of Bogura. Taking the Karatoya as the central dividing water-channel of the district, the other rivers may be classified into the eastern and the Western systems. The course of all the rivers is, with such allowances as must be made for beds and windings, nearly uniform north and south. The eastern rivers are Monas, Charkadaha and Khamati besides a few other smaller ones. Through the khiar tracts in the western parts of the district flow the Nagar, the Tulshiganga, Nagar and other minor streams.

Evidences show that the rivers Karatoya and Nagar have changed their courses in the past, while the Jamuna, lying on the eastern boundary of the district, is in fact a new channel of the Brahmaputra. A very small river, Tarai used to occupy more or
less the present location of the Jamuna. At that time the Brahmaputra used to flow to the east round the foot of the Garo Hills. The earliest evidence of the Brahmaputra river consists of a group of large Brahmaputra-size river scars which extend into the Sylhet basin flanking the southern edge of the Shillong plateau . The main river apparently extended east beyond this locality and then swung south into the Bay of Bengal. By the time of Rennell's mapping, this course had been abandoned in favour of a shorter route down what is still called the old Brahmaputra river past Mymensingh.

By the early 1770s the major diversion of the Brahmaputra into its present channel, west of the Madhupur jungle, had occurred. There is no complete agreement as to when this diversion down the Jenai river of Rennell occurred. Apparently by 1830 the diversion of low-river flow down the new channel was complete.

Rivers in Bogra District

 Bangali River
 Karatoya River
 Nagar River
 Jamuna River
 Tulshiganga River
 Isamoti River

Khulna Division
 Baleshwar River
 Bhairab River
 Kholpetua River
 Mayur River
 Pasur River
 Rupsha River
 Shibsa River

Rivers in Kushtia District
The rivers of the former Nadia district, of which Kushtia District was a part, were grouped together and known as "Nadia Rivers" because of the peculiar condition of the Nadia district and special measures taken by the government to keep them flowing. All the rivers of the former Nadia district (and of the present Kushtia District) were offshoots of the Padma (lower Ganges). But at one time when the Ganges found its way to the sea along the course of the Bhagirathi, there must have been some earlier streams to carry the drainage of the Darjeeling-Himalayas to the sea. Bhairab is said to be one of those streams. Later the Ganges drifted to the east and the Padma grew mighty, taking all the drainage of northern and upper Bengal.

 Padma River
 Bhairab River
 Bhodra River
 Mathabhanga River
 Kobadak River
 Garai River
 Kaliganga River
 Isamoti river pabna

Mymensingh District

The Jamuna, nowhere less than 4 miles wide during rain, runs in the west and the equally important Meghna encloses the district on the east. They are connected by the old channel of the Brahmaputra running through the centre of the district in a south-easterly direction from above Bahadurabad up to Bhairab Bazar.

Rivers in Mymensingh District

 Dhanu River
 Kangsha River
 Jinai River
 Brahmaputra River
 Pakhria

Noakhali District

The district of Noakhali is not intersected by as many rivers as the other deltaic districts of Bangladesh. On the western and southern parts of the district and between the islands flows the Meghna with all its bifurcations each of which is much larger than an ordinary river, and on the east the Feni subdivision is drained by the great and little Feni rivers. In the intervening country there are no rivers of any size and the drainage there depends on a few tidal channels or khals, of which the principal are the Noakhali khal, the Mahendra Khal and the Bhowaniganj Khal.

In sharp contrast with the mainland to its south, there is a network of khals in the islands. As one advances from the older formation of chars towards the newer ones, the number of khals gradually increases. The khals gradually silt up, but where diluvion goes on, new khals come into existence and the old ones become wider and wider.

Rivers in Noakhali District

 Meghna River
 Bhawaniganj Khal River
 Mahendrak Khal River
 Noakhali Khal River
 Little Feni River
 Big Feni River
 Muhuri River
 Seloneah River

Pabna District

The district is intersected by rivers of varying magnitude. But in fact, the river system is constituted by the Padma and the Jamuna with their interlacing offshoots and tributaries. Besides these flowing streams, the interior is visited by the abandoned beds of old rivers, most of which are dry except in the rains.

The general trend of the drainage of the Serajganj subdivision is from north-west to south-east, the rivers entering it from the north-west flow into the Jamuna after a tortuous course. In the Sadar subdivision, however, the general slope of the country is from west to east, and the main rivers fall into the Hurasagar, a tributary of the Jamuna.

Rivers in Pabna District

 Padma River
 Ichhamati River
 Baral River
 Atrai River
 Chiknai River
 Jamuna River
 Kazipur River
 Karatoya River

Rajshahi District

Excepting the Ganges or the Padma, the Mahananda and the Atrai, the rivers of Rajshahi district are of little hydrographic importance. For, most of the rivers are more or less moribund, that is, they are not active flowing streams except
during the rainy season. During the rainy season these moribund rivers act as excellent drainage channels draining off
a large volume of water and have a considerable current. Most of these rivers are narrow and flow in well-defined channels.

Principal rivers in Rajshahi District

 Padma River
 Mahananda River
 Atrai River
 Gur River
 Jamuna River
 Baral River
 Musakhan River
 Nandakuja River
 Gumani River
 Baralai River
 Narad River

Tangail District

Tangail District is flanked on the west by the mighty river Jamuna, which is nowhere less than 4 miles wide during the rainy season. The Dhaleshwari, first an old channel of the Ganges and then of the Brahmaputra, cuts across the south-western corner of the district on its powerful sweep to join the Meghna near Narayanganj. The old name of Dhaleshwari was "Gajghata". It used to flow afterwards by the Salimabad Channel and then at last by Porabari Channel. A part of the eastern boundary of the district runs close to the Banar River. The river Bangshi flows almost down the middle of the district, branching out from the old Brahmaputta to the north from near Jamalpur. Bangshi falls into Dhaleswari near Savar, in Dhaka district. The Bangshi forms a natural barrier to the Madhupur Jungle on the Tangail side, all the way from Madhupur to Mirzapur. It is fordable at only two or three places near Basail on its my to river Meghna. Dhaleswari itself however takes out from the Jamuna from inside Tangail district.

Among other important rivers of the district, Lohajang is worth mentioning. It flows past the district headquarters of Tangail and is almost dead at present (in moribund condition). Other rivers are Khiru, Nanglai, Atia, and Jhinai. The old Brahmaputra's most important offshoot is the Jhinai; striking off near Jamalpur it rejoins the Jamuna north of Sarishabari, while another branch flows past Gopalpur. Now these sub-systems of rivers, viz, Bangshi and Banar, and the Lohajang, Khiru, Nangtai, Atia and Jhinai are all dying out because of the shift of the old Brahmaputra river from its former channel to the present Jamuna channel.

The most important question in connection with the river system of Tangail vis-a-vis Mymensingh district is when and why the Brahmaputra River changed its main old channel. During the last 150 years or so, this diversion of the old Brahmaputra to its present Jamuna channel has considerably prompted the geographers and geologists to enquire deep into it. Two theories are advanced: As explanation of the diversion, one theory describes the gradual uplift of the Madhupur Tract and a final trigger action of the Teesta diversion in 1787 as the chief factor; and the other theory states that the Brahmaputra diversion resulted directly from a major increase in its volume of water due to beheading of the Tsangpo river of Tibet by Dihang, a tributary of the then small Brahmaputral. It has now been proved that the great Tibetan river Tsangpo joined the Brahmaputra about 1780 and this accession was more important than the Teesta floods in deciding the Brahmaputra to try a shorter way to the sea.

With the help of Major James Rennell's maps (1764 to 1773) and of the Revenue Survey it is possible to reconstruct the history of the Bengal Delta and its river systems. It was Rennell who carried out the first ever accurate cadastral surveys and laid the basis for the geographical study of Bengal. At the end of the 18th century, probably as a result of the great Tista floods in 1787, the Brahmaputra changed its course and joined the Padma at Goulundo. No piece-meal study of an intricate river system is possible, without distortion and inadequacy.

Even though we assume that the change in the course of the main waters of the old Brahmaputra took place suddenly in 1787, the year of the famous flooding of the Teesta river, the Teesta has been always a wandering river, sometimes joining the Ganges, sometimes being shifted outwards by the superior strength of the river Ganges and forced to join the Brahmaputra at last.

Whatever might have been the cause, by 1830, the diversion of old Brahmaputra was complete, ushering in a gradual but radical change in the river system of the Tangail district. The old channel of the Brahmaputra had been reduced to its present insignificance.

In 1850 Sir Joseph Hooker wrote "we are surprised to hear that within the last 20 years the main channel of Brahmaputra had shifted its course westwards, its eastern channel silted up so rapidly that the Jamuna eventually became the principal stream.

Rivers in Tangail District
 Jamuna River (205 km)
 Bangshi River (238 km)
 Pungli River
 Louhajang River
 Dhaleshwari River (160 km)

References

External links
 
 
 

Bangladesh
Rivers
Bay of Bengal